Luciano Ábalos (born 13 March 1978) is a retired Argentine football striker.

Early life

Career

Personal life

Achievements and honours

References

External links

1978 births
Living people
Argentine footballers
Chacarita Juniors footballers
Atlético Tucumán footballers
Quilmes Atlético Club footballers
The Strongest players
San Martín de San Juan footballers
Defensores de Belgrano footballers
Coronel Bolognesi footballers
Aldosivi footballers
Club Atlético El Linqueño players
Club Aurora players
Deportivo Maipú players
Argentine Primera División players
Bolivian Primera División players
Association football forwards
Argentine expatriate footballers
Expatriate footballers in Bolivia
Argentine expatriate sportspeople in Bolivia
Expatriate footballers in Peru
Argentine expatriate sportspeople in Peru